Heriberto is the Spanish and Portuguese form of the masculine given name Herbert. It may refer to:

Osvaldo Heriberto Hurtado Galeguillo (born 1957), Chilean retired footballer who played as a striker
Heriberto Araújo (born 1983), Spanish journalist and writer
Heriberto Jara Corona (1879–1968), Mexican revolutionary and politician, Governor of Veracruz
Heriberto González (born 1959), Cuban fencer
Heriberto Herrera (1926–1996), Paraguayan football coach and player
Heriberto Lazcano Lazcano (1974–2012), Mexican drug trafficker who heads the Mexican drug cartel Los Zetas
Heriberto Gil Martínez (1903–1933), Colombian aviator
Heriberto Morales (born 1975), Mexican former football (soccer) defender
Heriberto Rojas (born 1942 or '43), former Costa Rican footballer
Heriberto Rentería Sánchez, the mayor of Puerto Peñasco, Sonora, a city in Mexico
Heriberto Seda (born 1967), American serial killer who struck New York City from 1990 to 1993
Heriberto Correa Yepes (1916–2010), Colombian Prelate of Roman Catholic Church

See also
Estádio Heriberto Hülse, football stadium in Criciúma, Santa Catarina, Brazil
General Heriberto Jara International Airport (IATA: VER, ICAO: MMVR), international airport at Veracruz, Veracruz, Mexico
Heriberto Gíl Martínez Airport, located in the municipality of Tulua in the department of Valle del Cauca, Colombia

Spanish masculine given names